Temple Cowton Preceptory was a priory in North Yorkshire, England.

As with other sites owned by the Knights Templar, after the order was suppressed, their estates were given to the Knights Hospitaller.

References

Monasteries in North Yorkshire